María del Carmen Gana López (180015 April 1880) was a Chilean aristocrat and a First Lady of Chile.

Biography 

Gana López was the daughter of Agustín Domingo Gana y Darrigrande and María Dolores López y Guerrero Villaseñor. She married Manuel Blanco Encalada on 29 November 1818, and together they had 6 children. She was a confidant and adviser for her husband throughout his political career. 

Blanco acted as Interim President of Chile from 9 July 1826 until 9 September 1826, during which Gana served as First Lady. In spite of her short tenure, Gana used her position as an opportunity to act on her passion for social service. She arranged for her husband to allow the Congregation of the Good Shepherd, a Catholic religious order, to establish the first orphanage in San Felipe.

During her husband's tenure as a minister to France, their home in Paris became a point of gathering for distinguished Americans and Europeans. Gana was also a close friend of many Parisian artists and intellectuals.

While in Paris, Gana's daughter Teresa married a wealthy Chilean man. Teresa's godparents during the ceremony were Napoleon III and Eugénie de Montijo. Gana maintained a permanent correspondence with the couple even after her return to Santiago.

Gana died 15 April 1880, and is buried in the Cementerio General de Santiago.

References 

1800 births
1880 deaths
People from Santiago
First ladies of Chile
19th-century Chilean people